Vincent Daniel Blondel (born April 28, 1965) is a Belgian professor of applied mathematics and current rector of the University of Louvain (UCLouvain) and a visiting professor at the Massachusetts Institute of Technology (MIT). Blondel's research lies in the area of mathematical control theory and theoretical computer science. He is mostly known for his contributions in computational complexity in control, multi-agent coordination and complex networks.

Education 

Blondel studied philosophy, mathematics, engineering and computer science in Louvain-la-Neuve, Grenoble, London and Oxford. He completed a master thesis in engineering at the Institut National Polytechnique de Grenoble, he holds a MSc in mathematics from Imperial College of Science and Technology and a degree in philosophy, a master's degree in engineering (summa cum laude) and a PhD in applied mathematics from Université catholique de Louvain.

Career 
In 1993-1994 he was a Göran Gustafsson Fellow at the Royal Institute of Technology (Stockholm) and in 1994-1995 he was a Research Fellow at the National Institute for Research in Computer Science and Control (INRIA) in Paris. From 1995 to 1999 he was an assistant professor at the Institute of Mathematics of the Université de Liège before joining the Louvain School of Engineering of UCLouvain where he has been since then.  He was  a research visitor with the Australian National University, the University of California at Berkeley, the Santa Fe Institute, the Mittag-Leffler Institute of the Royal Swedish Academy of Sciences and Harvard University. He was a visiting professor of the Ecole Nationale Supérieure in Lyon in 1998 and at the Université Paris VII - Diderot in 1999, 2000 and 2002. In 2005-2006 he was a visiting professor and a Fulbright scholar with the Department of Electrical Engineering and Computer Science of the  Massachusetts Institute of Technology. In 2010-2011 he was a visiting professor with the MIT Laboratory for Information and Decision Systems (LIDS) of the  Massachusetts Institute of Technology.

Blondel is a former associate editor of the European Journal of Control (Springer) and of Systems and Control Letters (Elsevier). He is an editor of the journal Mathematics of Control, Signals, and Systems He has published about 100 journal articles and 6 books.

At UCLouvain, Blondel has founded the Group on Large Graphs and Networks. He has supervised 20 doctoral and postdoctoral researchers and 15 visiting professors. He was department head in 2003-2010 and a university president candidate in 2009.

In 2013, Blondel has become the dean of the Louvain School of Engineering.

He was elected the Rector of the University of Louvain for the term 2014-2019, and reelected again in 2019 until 2024.

Honors and awards
 Grant from the Trustees of the Mathematics Institute of Oxford University (1992)
 Prize Agathon De Potter of the Belgian Royal Academy of Science (1993)
 Prize Paul Dubois of the Montefiore Institute (1993)
 Triennal SIAM prize on control and systems theory (2001)
 Prize Adolphe Wetrems of the Belgian Royal Academy of Science (2006)
 Antonio Ruberti prize in systems and control of the IEEE (2006)
 Named a Fellow of the Institute of Electrical and Electronics Engineers (IEEE) in 2013 for his contributions to computational analysis of systems and networks.

Teaching
In 2012, he is in charge of the following courses at UCLouvain :
 LINMA	 1691 : Discrete mathematics I : Graphs algorithmics and theory
 LINMA 1702 : Optimisation Models and Methods
 LINMA 2111 : Discrete mathematics II: Algorithms and complexity
 LINMA 2120 :  System theory seminar
 LINMA 2472 : Special questions about discrete mathematics.
The last course is following the online course of M. Chiang from Princeton University : "20Q about networks : Friends, Money and Bytes"

References

External links
 Home Page
 UCLouvain Page
 Mathematics Genealogy Project profile
  Large Graphs and Networks research group (at UCLouvain)
 Laboratory for Information and Decision Systems (at MIT)

Control theorists
Living people
Academic staff of the Université catholique de Louvain
1965 births
Network scientists
Fellow Members of the IEEE
21st-century Belgian engineers
Belgian computer scientists
Rectors of universities in Belgium